Philip Gilbert is a fictional character from, and the main antagonist of the E4 coming-of-age British comedy The Inbetweeners, played by Greg Davies, who made his first appearance during the pilot  episode "First Day", broadcast on 1 May 2008. He also appeared in the follow-up films The Inbetweeners Movie (2011) and The Inbetweeners 2 (2014).

Appearances 
In the pilot episode "First Day" Mr Gilbert meets new student Will McKenzie (Simon Bird) and takes an instant dislike to him, forcing Simon Cooper (Joe Thomas) to show him around the school. In the episode "Bunk Off" Simon and Will phone the school pretending to be Simon's mother, however Gilbert is not convinced and phones their parents. Later in the episode when they are back at school, Mr Gilbert confronts the group telling them that since they are in sixth form they have no legal obligation to stay in school, but quickly turns on Will and Simon, explaining that telephoning the school and pretending to be their parents is fraud and sending the pair to the headteacher. In the episode "Girlfriend" Mr Gilbert is seen hosting a school blind date charity show. In the episode "Xmas Party" Mr Gilbert makes Will the chairman for the Christmas party committee but only because Will was the only person to apply. In "The Fashion Show", Mr Gilbert entrusts Will with collecting money for the charity event the school is hosting. Will originally interprets this as a sign of trust, but is quickly informed that he is being asked to do it as in previous years money had 'gone missing' and because if that were to happen again, Mr Gilbert 'could break' him.

Personality 

Mr Gilbert is misanthropic, sarcastic and bitter, using his wit and sardonicism to mock and bully the children that he as head of year should look after. Physically, Mr Gilbert is a looming figure which helps him to intimidate others. Will describes him as a "lunatic giant", "wanker", "pet ape" and "huge massive freak who likes to suck the headmaster's balls". He makes his hatred of his job and his students known. Will attempts to endear himself to Mr Gilbert despite his constant animosity towards him.

Reception 
Portrayed by Greg Davies, Mr Gilbert has been described as one of the funniest characters on the show with him having "some of the funniest moments throughout The Inbetweeners". Before his acting career, Davies "was a real-life teacher for 13 years before becoming a stand-up comedian and actor [...] he was perfectly trained for the role of Rudge Park's scariest teacher". "He's kind of the teacher I always fantasised about being because children are absolutely petrified of him."

References 

The Inbetweeners
British comedy television characters
Fictional schoolteachers
Television characters introduced in 2008
Male characters in television
British male characters in television